Viron may refer to:

Viron P. Vaky (1925–2012), American diplomat
an alternative form of Vyronas, a suburb of Athens, Greece
Viron, a fictional city in The Book of the Long Sun by Gene Wolfe
Viron, a playable race (or their language) in the computer RTS game Ground Control II
Viron Transit, a bus company servicing the Ilocos Region, Philippines

See also 

 Virion, a virus particle